Saghadeh (also Romanized as Şaghādeh and Şoghādeh; also known as Chagādeh, Seqādeh, Şoghād, and Sugādeh) is a village in Khafr Rural District, Khafr District, Jahrom County, Fars Province, Iran. At the 2006 census, its population was 816, in 206 families.

References 

Populated places in  Jahrom County